Sahy is a small village in the Kherson Raion of the Kherson Oblast in Ukraine with a pre-war population of 770.

Sahy is located around 8.5 miles (13.6 km) south-east of the city of Kherson.

The village's time-zone is UTC+2 (UTC+3 in the summer), which is standard across Ukraine except for the separatist Donetsk and Luhansk People's Republics, which observe Moscow Standard time (UTC+3).

The village is currently occupied by Russian forces, due to the 2022 Russian invasion of Ukraine.

References 

Villages in Kherson Raion